Nationality words link to articles with information on the nation's poetry or literature (for instance, Irish or France).

Events
1451:
 August 1 – A manuscript of Dante's Divine Comedy is sold in London
1452:
 Niccolò Perotti made Poet Laureate in Bologna by Frederick III, Holy Roman Emperor

Works published
1450:
 Santillana, Bias contra Fortuna, published about this year; Spain
 Vetteve, Guttilaya, narrative poem by a Sinhalese monk

1454:
 Padmanabhan, Kanhadade Prabandha, Indian, Rajasthani-language

1456:
 François Villon, Le Petit Testament

Births
Death years link to the corresponding "[year] in poetry" article:

1450:
 August 18 – Marko Marulić (died 1524), Croatian poet, philosopher and Christian humanist, known as "the Crown of the Croatian Medieval Age" and the "father of the Croatian Renaissance"; He signed his works as "Marko Marulić Splićanin" ("Marko Marulić of Split"), "Marko Pečenić", "Marcus Marulus Spalatensis", or "Dalmata"
 Hieronymus Balbus, also called "Girolamo Balbi" and "Accellini", born about this year (died c. 1530), Italian, Renaissance humanist, Latin-language poet, diplomat, and bishop Latin-language poet
 Henry Bradshaw (died 1513), English
 Benedetto Cariteo (died 1514), Italian
 Gian Giacomo della Croce born about this year (died sometime after 1502), Italian, Latin-language poet
 Lodovico Lazzarelli (died 1500), Italian, Latin-language poet
 Per Raff Lille born about this year (died c. 1500), Denmark
 Jean Marot born about this year (born c. 1526), French poet and father of poet Clément Marot
 Faustino Perisauli born about this year (died 1523), Italian, Latin-language poet
 Pothana (died 1510), Telugu poet best known for his translation of the Bhagavata Purana from Sanskrit to Telugu
 Panfilo Sasso born about this year (died 1527), Italian, Latin-language poet
 Cornelio Vitelli born about this year (died  c. 1525), Italian, Latin-language poet

1452
 Francesco Negri (humanist) (died 1524 or sometime later), Italian, Latin-language poet

1453:
 Ermolao Barbaro, sources differ on his death year, with some simply stating 1493 and others stating 1493 year and 1495 are each possible (1493),(born 1453), Italian, Latin-language poet
 Filippo Beroaldo (died 1505), Italian, Latin-language poet
 Michele Marullo, also known as "Michael Marullus" (died 1500, or about that year), Italian, Latin-language poet

1454:
 Gerolamo Bologni (died 1517), Italian, Latin-language poet
 Nicodemo Folengo born sometime from this year to 1456, Italian, Latin-language poet
 Angelo Poliziano, also known as "Politan" and "Angelo Ambrogini" (died 1494), Italian, Latin-language poet and humanist

1455:
 Probo de Marianis (died 1499), Italian, Latin-language poet
 Giovanni Armonio Marso, born about this year (death year not known), Italian, Latin-language poet
 Johannes Reuchlin (died 1522), German

1456:
 Giovanni Aurelio Augurelli (died 1524), Italian, Latin-language poet
 Nicodemo Folengo born sometime from 1454 to this year, Italian, Latin-language poet

1457:
 Sebastian Brant born this year or in 1458 (died 1521), German
 Šiško Menčetić (died 1527), Croatian poet and Ragusan nobleman
 Jacopo Sannazaro, also known as "Iacopo Sannazaro" (died 1530), Italian poet,  humanist and epigrammist who also wrote in Neapolitan and Latin

1458:
 Pietro Bonomo, also known as "Petrus" (died 1546), Italian, humanist, diplomat, bishop of Trieste and Latin-language poet
 Sebastian Brant born this year or in 1457 (died 1521), German
 Giorgio Anselmo, born this year or sometime earlier (died 1528), Italian, Latin-language poet; grandson of another Giogrio Anselmo, an Italian mathematician and astronomer (died 1440)
 Jacopo Sannazaro  (died 1530), Italian poet,  humanist and epigrammist who also wrote in Neapolitan and Latin

1459:
 February 1 – Conrad Celtis (died 1508), German and Latin-language poet

Deaths
Birth years link to the corresponding "[year] in poetry" article:

1450:
 Olivier Basselin (born 1400), French poet
 Badr Shirvani (born 1387), Persian poet

1451:
John Lydgate (born 1370), English monk and poet
 Michault Taillevent died about this year (born c. 1395), French

1456:
 Gilbert Hay, or perhaps "Sir Gilbert the Hay", who may have been a different person; last mentioned this year (born c. 1403), Scottish poet and translator
 Juan de Mena (born 1411), Spanish poet appointed veinticuatro (one of twenty-four aldermen) of Córdoba, secretario de cartas latinas (secretary of Latin letters) and cronista real (royal chronicler)

1457:
 Basinio da Parma (born 1425–1457), Italian, Latin-language poet

1458:
 Inigo Lopez de Mendoza (born 1398), Spanish

1459:
 March 3 – Ausiàs March (born 1397), Spanish, Catalan poet
 Shōtetsu (born 1381), Japanese Waka poet during the medieval period

See also

 Poetry
 15th century in poetry
 15th century in literature

Notes

15th-century poetry
Poetry